Peyton List (born August 8, 1986) is an American actress and professional model, known for roles on Mad Men, FlashForward, The Tomorrow People and Frequency. She began her career on daytime television, playing Lucy Montgomery on the CBS soap opera As the World Turns from 2001 to 2005, before she went to primetime with regular roles on the short-lived dramas Windfall (2006) and Big Shots (2007).

From 2008 to 2013, List had a recurring role as Jane Siegel in the AMC period drama Mad Men. In film, she has appeared in The Greatest Game Ever Played (2005), Shuttle (2009) and Meeting Evil (2012). List also starred in the short-lived science fiction dramas FlashForward (ABC, 2009–2010), and The Tomorrow People (The CW, 2013–2014). During the 2016–17 television season, she starred as the lead character in The CW drama series Frequency. In 2018, she had a recurring role in season 3 of the science fiction series Colony. She also starred on a recurring basis as Poison Ivy in the Fox crime drama series Gotham (2018–2019), and voiced the character in the 2019 animated film Batman: Hush.

Early life
List was born in Boston, Massachusetts, to Douglas List and Sherri Anderson, but grew up in Baltimore, Maryland, with her sister Brittany List. She began her education at Cedarcroft pre-school and Calvert School, and then went to the Roland Park Country School in Baltimore. She studied ballet at the School of American Ballet in New York City.

Career

Modeling
At the age of nine, she began a career as a model. Her first significant commercial appearance was as one of the "daughters next door" (together with her sister) in Washington Square.

Acting
List had a minor role in the HBO television series Sex and the City in 2000. The following year, she played a small part in an episode of Law & Order: Special Victims Unit, and started a three-year run as Lucy Montgomery on the CBS soap opera As the World Turns. She left the soap opera in 2005 and later appeared as Lucy Lane in an episode of Smallville, and reprised her role on the final season in 2010. In the same year, she guest-starred on Without a Trace, CSI: Miami, CSI: NY, and One Tree Hill.

In 2006, List was a series regular on the NBC drama Windfall, as Tally Reida. The series was canceled after one season, and List had a recurring role on the short-lived ABC drama Day Break. During the 2007 pilot season, List was cast in another ABC series, Big Shots, in which she played the role of Cameron Collinsworth, daughter of Dylan McDermott's character. The series also was canceled after one season. List also guest-starred on several television shows, including Moonlight, Ghost Whisperer, CSI: Crime Scene Investigation, Monk, Hawaii Five-0, and House of Lies. From 2008 to 2013, List appeared in a recurring role on the AMC series Mad Men, playing Don Draper's fill-in secretary who later became Roger Sterling's second wife. From 2009 to 2010, List starred on another ABC series FlashForward, as Nicole Kirby. In film, she appeared in The Greatest Game Ever Played (2005), Shuttle (2008), and Meeting Evil (2011).

In 2013, List was cast in the female lead role of Cara Coburn on The CW series The Tomorrow People. The series was cancelled after a single season. The following year, she had recurring roles in the CW series The Flash and in ABC's short-lived prime time soap opera Blood & Oil. In 2016, she was cast as lead character in the CW science fiction police drama Frequency.

In October 2017, she was cast as Ivy Pepper, also known as Poison Ivy, in the Fox drama series Gotham, taking over the role from previous portrayers Maggie Geha and Clare Foley.

Namefellow
List shares the same name with a fellow actress, Peyton List (born 1998). The younger List was interviewed by Access Hollywood, saying she uses Peyton R. List to avoid confusion. Union SAG-AFTRA's policy avoids actors with the same name; this instance went unnoticed. They appeared in the same scene—when the older List starred on As the World Turns as Lucy Montgomery. Years later, the younger List cited confusion when they stayed at the same hotel—they received daily call sheets and voicemails for each other. IndieWire noted the confusion appeared on the website Wikipedia, where both actresses's articles started out with exactly the same introduction text of: "Peyton List is an American actress and model." Both actresses provided voice performances for Batman: Hush (2019).

Filmography

Film

Television

Music video

References

External links

 
 

1986 births
20th-century American actresses
21st-century American actresses
Actresses from Baltimore
Actresses from Boston
American child actresses
American child models
American film actresses
American soap opera actresses
American television actresses
Living people
School of American Ballet alumni